is a Japanese long-distance runner. In 2019, he competed in the senior men's race at the 2019 IAAF World Cross Country Championships held in Aarhus, Denmark. He finished in 74th place.

References

External links 
 

Living people
1998 births
Place of birth missing (living people)
Japanese male long-distance runners
Japanese male cross country runners